Dan Dumitru Stângaciu, (born 9 August 1964) is a retired Romanian football goalkeeper and a current coach. He is best known for his spell with Steaua Bucharest in the 1980s and 1990s where he won the European Cup in 1986 and the European Super Cup in 1987.

He is one of the most famous and successful players who has ever played in the Romanian First League. He is 2nd in an all time ranking, tied with Giedrius Arlauskis, Ciprian Deac, Adrian Bumbescu, Mircea Lucescu and Tudorel Stoica, all with 7 championships won. Marius Lăcătuș won it 10 times and is ranked 1st.

Career
Aged 18, Stângaciu signs for FC Brașov but after only two years is signed by Steaua București, being the second goalkeeper option of the coach Emerich Jenei. As Helmuth Duckadam retired from football in 1986, Stângaciu becomes the first option of the new coach, Anghel Iordănescu.

He spent the season 1988–1989 on loan to FC Olt Scorniceşti, as Steaua preferred to sign Silviu Lung, but returned in Bucharest one year later.

In 1995, Stângaciu starts his adventure in the Turkish Premier Super Football League, playing for Vanspor and Kocaelispor.

He retired in 2001 and since then was for a while the goalkeepers' coach at FCU Politehnica Timişoara.

Stângaciu was Romanian football champion in 1985, 1986, 1987, 1988, 1989, 1993, 1994, 1995, won the Romania Cup in 1985, 1987 and 1992 and the Turkish Cup in 1997. He also won five caps for Romania, being part of the squad who played at the World Cup 1998.

On 25 March 2008, he was decorated by the president of Romania, Traian Băsescu for the winning of the UEFA Champions League with Ordinul "Meritul Sportiv" — (The Order "The Sportive Merit") class II.

Honours

Club
FCM Braşov
Romanian Second League: 1983–84
Steaua București
Romanian League: 1984–85, 1985–86, 1986–87, 1987–88, 1992–93, 1993–94, 1994–95
Romanian Cup: 1984–85, 1986–87, 1991–92
Romanian Superup: 1994
European Cup: 1985–86
UEFA Super Cup: 1986
Kocaelispor
Turkish Cup: 1996–97

Notes
 The 1983–1984 appearances and goals made for FCM Braşov are unavailable.

References

External links

1964 births
Living people
Sportspeople from Brașov
Romanian footballers
Romania international footballers
FC Brașov (1936) players
FC Olt Scornicești players
FC Steaua București players
Kocaelispor footballers
Vanspor footballers
1998 FIFA World Cup players
Romanian expatriate footballers
Expatriate footballers in Turkey
Süper Lig players
Liga I players
Liga II players
Association football goalkeepers